Sooran is a 2014 Indian Tamil-language neo-noir crime drama film directed by Balu Narayanan. It stars Karan, Anumol and Shefali Sharma in the lead roles. The film was released after being in production for four years, in July 2014.

Cast
Karan as Sadha
Anumol as Yamuna
Shefali Sharma
Jagan
Manivannan
Ponvannan
Raj Kapoor 
Santhana Bharathi
Mahadevan

Production
The film, directed by newcomer Balu Narayanan, began production in April 2010 and was shot across Tamil Nadu in Pollachi and Gobichettipalayam. The film was completed in late 2010, and in February 2011 it was reported that Karan had refused to dub for the film as a result of non-payment.

A grand audio launch event was held for the film in August 2011, with S. P. Jananathan and K. Bhagyaraj being the event's chief guests. The film remained completed but unreleased for three further years, before finally having a release in July 2014.

Soundtrack
Music composed by P.B.Balaji. The list of songs.

References

2014 films
2010s Tamil-language films
Indian action films
Films shot in Pollachi
2014 directorial debut films
2014 action films